Phantasm III: Lord of the Dead (also known as just Phantasm III) is a 1994 American science fantasy horror film and the second sequel in the Phantasm series, written and directed by Don Coscarelli. The film stars Angus Scrimm as the Tall Man, Reggie Bannister, and A. Michael Baldwin. It is followed by Phantasm IV: Oblivion.

Plot
Immediately after his apparent demise at the end of the previous film, a new Tall Man emerges from his dimension fork. At the same time, after being attacked and ejected from the hearse carrying Mike and Liz, a still alive Reggie watches as the car drives on and explodes. Reggie finds Liz dead but saves Mike from the Tall Man by threatening to kill them all with a grenade. The Tall Man retreats with Liz's head but promises to return when Mike is well again.

In 1988, after spending two years comatose in a hospital, Mike has a near death experience where his deceased brother Jody appears but is interrupted by the Tall Man. Awaking abruptly, he is attacked by a demonic nurse but quickly subdues her. Reggie arrives as she dies, her scalp bursting open to reveal a cranial sphere that takes off through the window after witnessing Mike awake. At Reggie's house, the Tall Man arrives via dimensional fork, fights off Reggie, transforms Jody into a charred sphere, and draws Mike through the gate with him.

The next morning, Reggie awakens and begins traveling towards an Idaho town the Jody-sphere muttered called Holtsville. Upon arriving in the deserted town, he is captured by three looters, who lock him in the trunk of his 1970 Barracuda. Reggie is rescued by a young boy named Tim, who kills the looters when they break into his house. After they have buried the bodies in the yard, Tim tells Reggie how the Tall Man took his parents and destroyed the town. In the morning, Reggie and Tim find the three graves empty and their pink hearse gone. Reggie tries to leave Tim at an orphanage, but the boy hides in a car trunk. Reggie enters a mausoleum and is confronted by a sphere, but he is subdued by two young women, Tanesha and Rocky, before he can destroy it. Reggie tries to warn them, but Tanesha is killed by the sphere. Tim appears and destroys it with his pistol. The three join forces, come upon a convoy of hearses driven by Gravers, and decide to follow them.

At night, Jody appears to Reggie in a dream and takes him to the Tall Man's lair, where they rescue Mike. As Reggie wakes, Jody opens a portal and Mike emerges. The Tall Man tries to follow, but Reggie closes the portal, severing the Tall Man's hands. After fighting off the Tall Man's minions, including the undead looters, they enter a large mausoleum in the city of Boulton. They discover a cryonics facility and Mike remembers that the Tall Man dislikes cold. While Reggie, Rocky, and Tim are separated and attacked by the looters, Mike consults with the Jody-sphere in a psychic link. Jody explains that the Tall Man is amassing an army to conquer dimensions. As he explains, they witness him removing the brain of a newly shrunken dwarf and placing it into a sphere thus turning the body into a drone and the mind into a killer. The Tall Man soon senses their presence and recaptures Mike. Two of the looters wheel in Tim on a gurney and Mike tries to tell him of the thousands of spheres he witnessed but the Tall Man paralyzes him before he can finish.

Meanwhile, Rocky defeats her attacker and helps Reggie. Cut free by the Jody-sphere, Tim runs into the remaining looters, who are killed by the Jody-sphere and Reggie's 4-barrel shotgun. The trio crash into the embalming room, where the Tall Man is operating on Mike's head. Rocky impales the Tall Man with a spear dipped in liquid nitrogen and they lock him in the freezer. However a golden sphere breaks out of his head and attacks them. Reggie catches it in a plunger and they manage to submerge it into the nitrogen tank. Mike inspects his head wound which is bleeding yellow blood and finds a golden sphere beneath the skin. With his eyes like silver spheres and complaining of the cold, he runs away but not before telling Reggie to stay away from him. Jody imparts some cryptic words on Reggie and assures him they'll be in touch before transforming and leaving too.

Reggie suggests exploring the mortuary but Rocky declines and leaves in a hearse. Tim reports that Mike tried to warn him, but they find out too late that there are thousands of spheres waiting to attack, and Reggie is pinned to the wall by them. He tells Tim "It's all over" and to just run. Just as Tim is about to take aim with his pistol, a new Tall Man appears and says "It's never over." He watches as Tim is suddenly attacked by a zombie in the freezer and pulled through a glass window, mirroring the ending of the first film.

Cast
Angus Scrimm as The Tall Man
A. Michael Baldwin as Mike Pearson
Reggie Bannister as Reggie
Bill Thornbury as Jody Pearson
Kevin Connors as Tim
Gloria Lynne Henry as Rocky
Cindy Ambuehl as Edna
Brooks Gardner as Rufus
John Davis Chandler as Henry
Claire Benedek as Tim's mother
Sarah Scott Davis as Tanesha

Production
After studio interference forced out A. Michael Baldwin for the second film, he was brought back in Phantasm III. Kerry Prior handled the sphere effects.

Release
The movie had a brief two-week theatrical run in two markets in May 1994: Baton Rouge and St. Louis. In both markets, Phantasm III was the highest-grossing film the two weeks it played. According to Reggie Bannister, Universal Studios refused to theatrically distribute the film in a proper release due to a conflict with Coscarelli. The film was released direct-to-video in October 1994. In 1996, the Los Angeles Times reported that Phantasm III was one of the top 100 highest selling direct-to-video titles.

An unrated version of the film was released in 2007 by Anchor Bay Entertainment, featuring an audio commentary by A. Michael Baldwin and Angus Scrimm, a deleted scene, and behind-the-scenes footage.

Reception
Rotten Tomatoes reports that Phantasm III received a positive review from 40% of ten surveyed critics, and the average rating was 4.57/10. Scott Weinberg of Fearnet wrote that while the sequels lack the punch of the original, they're still fun. Steve Barton of DreadCentral rated the film 3.5/5 stars and described the film's humor as hit-or-miss.

The film won Fangorias Chainsaw Award for best limited-release film.

References

External links

 
 
 
 
 

1994 films
1994 horror films
American action horror films
American comedy horror films
Films directed by Don Coscarelli
American satirical films
American supernatural horror films
American sequel films
Phantasm (franchise)
Grave-robbing in film
1990s English-language films
1990s American films